Chloroalkyl ethers are a class of organic compounds with the general structure R-O-(CH2)n-Cl, characterized as an ether connected to a chloromethyl group via an alkane chain.

Chloromethyl methyl ether (CMME) is an ether with the formula . It is used as an alkylating agent and industrial solvent to manufacture dodecylbenzyl chloride, water repellents, ion-exchange resins, polymers, and as a chloromethylation reagent. In organic synthesis the compound is used for the introduction of the methoxymethyl (MOM) protecting group.

Closely related compounds of industrial importance are bis(chloromethyl) ether (BCME) (closely related to chemical weapon sulfur mustard) and benzyl chloromethyl ether (BOMCl).

Methoxymethyl ethers (MOMs) and methoxyethyl ethers (MEMs) are common protecting groups in organic synthesis.

Safety
Chloroalkyl ethers are strong alkylating agents with attendant dangers. These compounds are human carcinogen.

References

Ethers
Organochlorides